"Paul Revere" is a song by American hip hop group Beastie Boys, released as the third single from their debut album Licensed to Ill (1986). It was written by Adam Horovitz, Joseph Simmons, Darryl McDaniels, and Rick Rubin. It was produced by Rick Rubin and the Beastie Boys. The song tells a fictional story of how the Beastie Boys met.

Adam Horovitz told how the song evolved from an incident when the Beastie Boys were waiting outside a recording studio for Run-D.M.C., when Joseph Simmons ("Run") suddenly came running down the street screaming incoherently. When he reached the Beastie Boys, he said "Here's a little story I got to tell...". After much confusion, Simmons stated "THAT's the song". The band worked on it from there.

Recording
Mike D remembered how the group played around with an 808 drum machine during the Ill sessions and Adam Yauch asked what the tracks would sound like if the beats were played backwards. “Run from Run-D.M.C. was there, and he was like, ’Man, this is crazy.’ But Yauch recorded this beat, bounced it to another tape, flipped it around — this is pre-digital sampling — and bounced it back to the multi-track tape,” he said. “The reversed beat basically became ’Paul Revere.’ Yauch saw this thing we couldn't see — and he killed it.”

Content
The song tells a fictional story of how Ad-Rock, Mike D, and MCA first met. Ad-Rock describes riding through the desert on a horse named Paul Revere, also the name of a horse in the musical Guys and Dolls, while he is on the run from the police. He runs into MCA, who asks him for a drink. When Ad-Rock refuses, MCA pulls a gun on him and says, "You got two choices of what you can do...I can blow you away or you can ride with me." Ad-Rock agrees, saying that he'll go if they can get to the border because "The sheriff's after me for what I did to his daughter".

The two ride to a bar and sit down next to Mike D, who tells them he's planning to rob the place. He then pulls out his guns and shoots them in the air, telling the people in the bar, "Your cash and your jewelry is what I expect!" MCA and Ad-Rock help Mike D escape with the money and jewelry, first causing a distraction and then helping him carry the stolen goods out, along with "Two girlies and a beer that's cold".

Whether intentionally or coincidentally, the meter of Paul Revere reflects that of the poem, "Paul Revere's Ride," by Longfellow..

Charts

Legacy and covers
Lyrics from the song are referenced and sampled in several rap songs by other artists. Cypress Hill did a cover of the song called "Busted in the Hood" on their album Till Death Do Us Part, with the lyrics changed to be about getting arrested for drug-dealing. The lyrics are also referenced several times in the song "Bad Guys Always Die" on the soundtrack to the film Wild Wild West.

It was covered by Justin Timberlake and Jimmy Fallon on Late Night with Jimmy Fallon as part of their "History of Rap" medley.

A cover was done by Zachariah and the Lobos Riders in a country styling on the album Alcoholiday.

A genre-bending cover was played by swing band The Asylum Street Spankers on their album Mercurial.

The Disco Biscuits debuted their cover of Paul Revere on New Year's Eve 2006 to open the second set. They continued to play it several times throughout 2007 and 2008.

N.W.A liked the song so much that they used to perform it with dirty lyrics early in their career, according to Ice Cube.

It is referenced in "Bad Guys Always Die" from the "Wild Wild West" soundtrack by Eminem and Dr. Dre. Eminem's final line in the song is "I grabbed two girlies and blunt that's rolled", referencing Ad-Rock's final line of "I grabbed two girlies and a beer that's cold"

E40 used the beat to make "Jump my bone" in 1998.

Rapper Missy Elliott sampled the beat in a small portion of her song "Funky Fresh Dressed" (featuring Ms. Jade) on her 2002 album Under Construction.

References

1986 singles
Beastie Boys songs
Songs about horses
Song recordings produced by Rick Rubin
Songs written by Rick Rubin
Songs written by Ad-Rock
Songs written by Darryl McDaniels
Songs written by Joseph Simmons
1986 songs
Def Jam Recordings singles